Richard Schneider (16 December 1919, Kaiserslautern – 28 April 1982) was a German football manager. He was in charge of 1. FC Kaiserslautern during the 1950s, winning two German football championships with the club, and appearing in two further finals as runners-up. 

Schneider left Kaiserslautern in 1961 and became the manager at Preußen Münster. He managed the club during the inaugural 1963–64 Bundesliga season, but could not prevent the club from being relegated to the Regionalliga divisions. He went on to manage SSV Reutlingen before briefly returning to Preußen Münster for a second spell.

Honours
 German football championship: 1951, 1953

Literature
 Günter Rohrbacher-List: 1. FC Kaiserslautern. Der Berg, das Land und der Ball. Verlag Die Werkstatt, Göttingen 1995, . (german)
 Jürgen Bitter: Die Meistermacher. wero press, Pfaffenweiler 2004, . (german)

References

External links
 

1919 births
1982 deaths
People from Kaiserslautern
German football managers
1. FC Kaiserslautern managers
SC Preußen Münster managers
People from the Palatinate (region)